Alex Anthopoulos (born May 25, 1977) is a Canadian professional baseball executive, currently working as the general manager and president of baseball operations for the Atlanta Braves. He was the senior vice president of baseball operations and general manager of the Toronto Blue Jays of Major League Baseball (MLB) from 2010 to 2015, for whom he began as a scouting coordinator in 2003.  Prior to the Blue Jays, Anthopoulos got his start in professional baseball with the Montreal Expos organization in 2000.  In 2015, he was named the Sporting News Executive of the Year after the Blue Jays advanced to the playoffs for the first time since 1993, reaching the American League Championship Series (ALCS). However, his term with the Blue Jays ended on October 29, 2015, when he declined a five-year contract extension. He served for two years as vice president of player development for the Los Angeles Dodgers.

Career

Montreal Expos (2000–2003)
In 2000, Anthopoulos was hired by the Montreal Expos as an unpaid intern, and worked sorting players' fan mail. After working in the mail room he would sit with the scouts at games and take notes, and was eventually moved to a scouting internship in Florida. In 2002, he was promoted to the Expos' scouting coordinator. He would leave the team at the end of the 2003 season, while working as the assistant scouting director.

Toronto Blue Jays (2003–2015)
Anthopoulos joined the Toronto Blue Jays in late 2003, as their scouting coordinator. After the 2005 season, he was promoted to assistant general manager (AGM) under J. P. Ricciardi.  While he was serving as AGM, the Blue Jays acquired  José Bautista and Edwin Encarnación, each of whom unexpectedly experienced a career renaissance, establishing new levels of production and consistency that were key components of the Blue Jays' offense during Anthopoulos' time as GM.  Bautista was the MLB home run leader from 2010–11, and, in each year from 2010 to 2015, was an All-Star and hit at least 27 home runs.  Encarnacion hit at least 34 home runs each year from 2012 to 2015.

General Manager of Blue Jays 

Anthopoulos became the Blue Jays' general manager in October 2009, after Ricciardi was fired.  He began his tenure as the general manager by playing a major role in one of the biggest trades in Blue Jays history, "The Doc Deal". In the deal, Anthopoulos traded Roy Halladay to the Philadelphia Phillies for Kyle Drabek, Michael Taylor, and Travis d'Arnaud.

Anthopoulos was also instrumental in doubling the size of the Blue Jays' scouting department, growing it to 54 scouts in various positions. The 2010 draft, the first with Anthopoulos in charge, resulted in a highly successful draft with a number of players picked eventually enjoying significant playing careers in the majors, including Aaron Sanchez and Noah Syndergaard.

The Jays' first season with Anthopoulos at the helm resulted in an 85–77 record, good for fourth place in the American League (AL) East division. The club hit a franchise-record 257 home runs, the third-highest single-season total by any club in Major League history.

In January 2011, Anthopoulos completed a blockbuster trade by shipping another long-time face of the Blue Jays franchise, Vernon Wells, and the remaining US$86 million over the next four years to the Los Angeles Angels for catcher Mike Napoli and outfielder Juan Rivera. He then sent Napoli to the Texas Rangers for pitcher Frank Francisco, and later traded Rivera to the Los Angeles Dodgers for a player to be named later or cash considerations.

In July 2011, Anthopoulos made two successive trades to acquire center fielder Colby Rasmus from the St. Louis Cardinals. In the first, the Blue Jays traded pitching prospect Zach Stewart and reliever Jason Frasor to the Chicago White Sox for starting pitcher Edwin Jackson and infielder Mark Teahen. Jackson was then traded with outfielder Corey Patterson, and relief pitchers Marc Rzepczynski and Octavio Dotel to the Cardinals for Rasmus and relief pitchers Brian Tallet, P.J. Walters and Trever Miller.

Before the 2012 Major League Baseball season, Anthopoulos was known to make trades in order to acquire supplemental draft picks. The most prominent example was when he acquired Miguel Olivo, a Type B free agent, and declined his club option the next day making Olivo a free agent. The Blue Jays gained a supplemental first-round draft pick when Olivo signed with the Seattle Mariners, taking Dwight Smith, Jr.

In November 2012, Anthopolous completed a blockbuster deal with the Miami Marlins, acquiring shortstop Jose Reyes, pitchers Mark Buehrle and Josh Johnson, catcher John Buck, and infielder/outfielder Emilio Bonifacio in exchange for shortstop Yunel Escobar, pitcher Henderson Alvarez, catcher Jeff Mathis and four minor-league prospects. Cash was also sent to the Jays in the trade.

In December 2012, Anthopoulos acquired the 2012 National League Cy Young Award winner R. A. Dickey in a trade with the New York Mets that sent prospects Travis d'Arnaud, Noah Syndergaard, minor leaguer Wuilmer Becerra and Buck to New York. Toronto also received catcher Josh Thole and minor league catcher Mike Nickeas in the trade. As part of the transaction, the Blue Jays signed Dickey to an extension worth a total of $29 million over three years with a $12 million fourth year option.

In 2013, the Blue Jays finished at 74–88, in last place in the AL East.  The next year, they improved to 83–79 and third place.

During the 2014 offseason, Anthopoulos traded Canadian third baseman Brett Lawrie, along with three prospects, to the Oakland Athletics for Josh Donaldson.  In July 2015, he acquired Troy Tulowitzki and LaTroy Hawkins from the Colorado Rockies in exchange for Jose Reyes, Jeff Hoffman, and Miguel Castro. On July 30, he acquired star left-handed pitcher David Price from the Detroit Tigers in exchange for Daniel Norris, Matt Boyd, and Jairo Labourt. The next day, Anthopoulos traded for outfielder Ben Revere, and in August, acquired shortstop Cliff Pennington. Price went 9–1 with a 2.30 earned run average in  innings pitched for the Blue Jays. The Blue Jays, who had a 50–51 record on July 28, won 43 of their final 61 games to overtake the New York Yankees and win the AL East division crown for their first playoff appearance in 22 seasons.  With Donaldson, Bautista, and Encarnación (the latter two acquired by previous GM J.P. Ricciardi) each hitting at least 39 home runs in 2015, the Blue Jays led the major leagues in scoring at 5.50 runs per game.  Toronto's season ended in an American League Championship Series (ALCS) loss to the Kansas City Royals.  Donaldson was named the 2015 American League Most Valuable Player.

Anthopoulos rejected a five-year extension from the Blue Jays organization on October 29, 2015, and did not publicly reveal the reasons for his decision. He later said "I just think there's certain things that should remain private and behind closed doors, and I know sometimes that's hard to hear and hard to understand. I just think it's the right thing for the organization and the ball club and everybody involved." There was some speculation that his departure was due to the belief that he would not have full autonomy under new president/CEO Mark Shapiro. According to The Globe and Mail, "The talk around the water cooler is that Anthopoulos wanted the same job and responsibility that he had under Beeston, who hired him as GM.  That was having the ultimate say in all baseball-related decisions."  Shapiro refuted these claims on November 1, stating "It's not about autonomy, it's about collective success". He also denied suggestions that he "scolded" Anthopoulos over several deadline trades involving Blue Jays' top prospects.

Toronto's combined win–loss record was 489–483 while Anthopoulos was GM. On October 29, 2015, Sporting News named him Executive of the Year as selected by a panel of 47 major league executives.

Los Angeles Dodgers (2016–2017) 
On January 12, 2016, Anthopoulos was hired as the vice-president of baseball operations by the Los Angeles Dodgers.

Atlanta Braves (2017–present) 
On November 13, 2017, Anthopoulos was hired as the executive vice president and general manager of the Atlanta Braves after agreeing on a four-year contract. The Braves promoted Anthopoulos to president of baseball operations in February 2020, and extended his contract to the 2024 season.  The Braves would go on to win the 2021 World Series.

Record as a baseball executive

Personal
Anthopoulos is of Greek Canadian descent, born in Montreal, Quebec to John Anthopoulos, who owned a heating and ventilation company until his death in 1998. He is the youngest of three sons. Anthopoulos stopped playing sports as a teenager to focus on music, specifically the bass guitar. One of his brothers was a guitarist as well, and the other was a drummer and singer. Anthopoulos holds a degree in economics from McMaster University. Anthopoulos married Cristina in 2010, with whom he has two children, daughter Julia and son John.

International
Anthopoulos served as an advance scout for the Greek National Baseball Team for the 2004 Summer Olympics; which finished in 7th place.

References

External links

1977 births
Living people
Anglophone Quebec people
Atlanta Braves executives
Baseball people from Quebec
Canadian expatriate baseball people in the United States
Canadian sports executives and administrators
Canadian people of Greek descent
Los Angeles Dodgers executives
Major League Baseball general managers
McMaster University alumni
Montreal Expos personnel
Montreal Expos scouts
Sportspeople from Montreal
Toronto Blue Jays executives